Jacob Selmes (born 13 February 1986 in Katoomba, New South Wales) is an Australian former professional rugby league footballer who played in the 2000s for the Cronulla-Sutherland Sharks in the National Rugby League competition, as a .

Playing career
In the 2006 pre-season, Selmes was involved in an altercation with teammate Hutch Maiava, resulting in Selmes requiring twelve stitches after being punched in the head, as a result, Maiava was suspended until mid-season and fined for his actions. 

Selmes made his first grade debut for Cronulla-Sutherland against Penrith on 17 March 2007. Selmes was later awarded the Sharks Rookie of the Year in 2007. Selmes last match in first grade was in Round 15 2009 against Brisbane which Cronulla won 46–12.

Career highlights
Junior Club: Port Macquarie Sharks
First Grade Debut: 17 Mar 2007 V Penrith

References

External links
Cronulla Sharks profile
NRL profile
Statistics at leagueunlimited.com

1986 births
Living people
Australian rugby league players
Cronulla-Sutherland Sharks players
Rugby league players from Katoomba, New South Wales
Rugby league props